The Wanderers are a fictional group of superheroes appearing in comics published by DC Comics. They first appeared as allies of the Legion of Super-Heroes in Adventure Comics #375 written by Jim Shooter, illustrated by Win Mortimer with a cover by Neal Adams. DC published a thirteen-issue series featuring the team in the late 1980s.

Fictional history

Pre-Crisis
In their first appearance, the Wanderers were introduced as a team of adventurers that had existed for several years before the Legion of Super-Heroes were formed. The team's symbol was a mandala which their leader wore across his neck. The Wanderers were:

Celebrand – the leader and the group's strategist.
Psyche – mistress of emotions.
Quantum Queen – able to project or turn herself into any type of quantum energy.
Elvo – master swordsman who wields an energy sword.
Dartalg – expert with blowguns and darts. Has several types of darts for use, such as exploding darts.
Ornitho – born with wings and is able to shapeshift into any other bird.
Immorto – expert marksman who cannot be killed, instead his body automatically rejuvenates.

After meeting the Legion, the Wanderers were accidentally exposed to radiation from the Nefar Nebula which turned them evil. They stole a valuable gemstone and faced various Legion members in contests of strength. The Legion managed to figure out what had happened to the Wanderers and reverse the process. The two teams parted as friends.

The Wanderers then reappeared as guests at Duo Damsel and Bouncing Boy's wedding, and also reappeared during the Legion's clash with Darkseid.

Artist Dave Cockrum's redesign sketch for the Wanderers was published in Marvel Comics' X-Men Anniversary Magazine (1993), which showed that one of the originally planned members was Nightcrawler, who Cockrum instead ended up using as a member of the X-Men after he moved to Marvel Comics.

Post-Crisis
In June 1988, the Wanderers appeared in their own eponymous title, written by Doug Moench, which ran for thirteen issues. Original artist Steve Dillon redesigned the characters, however he was replaced by Dave Hoover and Robert Campanella who redesigned them again. In this series, all the Wanderers were killed then recreated by Clonus, their Controller mentor, with upgraded powers and drastically different bodies with the exception of Celebrand, whose cloning attempt failed:

Dartalon (formerly Dartalg) – now changed into an almost monstrous form, with quills coming out of his body and out of his hand like talons instead of his simply using them as weapons.
Elvar (formerly Elvo) – now owned an energy sword that fired emotion-triggered blasts.
Re-Animage (formerly Immorto) – now had the power to heal and revive other people.
Aviax (formerly Ornitho) – retained his original powers.
Psyche – retained her original name and powers.
Quantum Queen – retained her original name and powers.

The new Wanderers ultimately solved the murder of their original selves and became agents of the United Planets. On their final mission, they successfully created a clone of their former leader Celebrand and opted to follow mysterious aliens into another dimension.

Five Years Later
Inexplicably, Dartalon was later seen among Leland McCauley's collection of captive statues.

2004 Legion
In the continuity of the 2004 Legion series, the Wanderers are a black ops superhero team created by the United Planets to covertly combat the Dominators. All of the Wanderers except Mekt Ranzz were killed fighting the Dominators. Mekt then recruited heroes such as Polar Boy, Inferno, White Witch, Nemesis Kid, and Plant Lad and recreated the team. The Wanderers then joined forces with the Legion to stop a Dominator invasion of the U.P. After helping the Legion defeat the Dominators, the Wanderers were offered Legion membership by Supergirl but fled when Mekt was later arrested for mind-controlling the population of Winath. Other members of the team included a figure resembling Tyr and the team's co-ordinator Tarik.

The members of this version of the Wanderers includes:
Grav – anti-grav acrobat.
Inferno – generates heat and light.
Jeyra Entinn – Saturnian telepath.
Kid Quake – generates earthquakes.
Kromak – able to graft body parts together.
Mekt Ranzz – Team leader. Generates electricity.
Micro Lass – giant who shrinks down to six feet.
Nemesis Kid – powers unknown.
Physo – powers unknown.
Plant Lad – accelerates plant growth.
Polar Boy – slows molecular movement.
Telekinesis – telekinetic.
Thoom – super-strength.
Vrax Gozzl – Coluan who possesses a tenth-level intellect.
White Witch – Spellcasting.

Earth-247 Legion
Following the events of Final Crisis: Legion of Three Worlds, the 1994 Legion, whose universe was destroyed during the events of Infinite Crisis, decide to travel the Multiverse under the guidance of Shikari Lonestar in an attempt to find and rescue survivors of other lost universes, and take the name "the Wanderers". XS and Gates decide to remain behind with the original Legion, the former to explore her new world and locate lost relatives & the latter to provide a non-humanoid voice for the group.

References

External links
 
 The Wanderers at Cosmic Teams!

Comics characters introduced in 1968
1988 comics debuts
DC Comics titles
Legion of Super-Heroes
Characters created by Jim Shooter
Characters created by Win Mortimer
Comics by Doug Moench